Amphibulima is a genus of air-breathing land snails, a terrestrial pulmonate gastropod mollusks in the family Amphibulimidae. 

Amphibulima is the type genus of the subfamily Amphibuliminae.

Species 
Species in the genus Amphibulima include:
 Amphibulima browni Pilsbry, 1899 - endemic to Dominica
 Amphibulima cucullata Lamarck, 1805
 Amphibulima pardalina Guppy, 1868 - endemic to Dominica
 Amphibulima patula (Bruguière, 1792)
 Amphibulima patula patula (Bruguière, 1792)
 Amphibulima patula dominicensis Pilsbry, 1899 - endemic to Dominica
 Amphibulima rawsonis Bland, 1876
 Amphibulima tigrina (Lesueur in Férussac, 1821)

Species brought into synonymy
 Amphibulima depressa (Rang, 1834) accepted as Pellicula depressa (Rang, 1834) (superseded combination)
 Amphibulima felina Guppy, 1873 accepted as Omalonyx unguis (d'Orbigny, 1836) (junior synonym)
 Amphibulima imbricata Rochebrune, 1882: synonym of Hyalimax imbricatus (Rochebrune, 1882) (original combination)
 Amphibulima rubescens (Deshayes, 1830) - endemic to Martinique: synonym of Rhodonyx rubescens (Deshayes, 1830)
 Amphibulima succinea Lamarck, 1805: synonym of Succinea putris (Linnaeus, 1758) (invalid: unjustified replacement

Comparison of species of Amphibulima:

References

 Bank, R. A. (2017). Classification of the Recent terrestrial Gastropoda of the World. Last update: July 16th, 2017

External links 
 Lamarck, J.-B. de. (1805). Sur l'Amphibulime. Annales du Muséum d'histoire naturelle. 6: 303-306
 Guppy, R. J. L. (1868). On the terrestrial mollusks of Dominica and Grenada, with an account of some new species from Trinidad. Annals and Magazine of Natural History. (4) 1: 429-442

Amphibulimidae